Daju Mongo, also Wadai Daju or Dar Daju Daju, is an Eastern Sudanic language, one of three closely related languages in the area called "Daju" (the other two being the Nyala language and the Sila language. It is spoken in Chad by the Dar Daju Daju people near the Darfur border. There are three dialects, Bardangal, Eref, and Gadjira.

Phonology

Consonants 

 Sounds /z h/ are only heard among Arabic loanwords.
 /s/ can be heard as [ʃ] when in the environment of palatal consonants, or before front vowels.

Vowels 

 Sounds /e, o/ can be heard as [ɛ, ɔ] when in closed syllables.

References

Daju languages
Languages of Chad